Søren Andersen (19 December 1925 – 23 September 1998) was a Danish footballer. He was part of Denmark's squad at the 1952 Summer Olympics, but he did not play in any matches.

References

1925 births
1998 deaths
Association football forwards
Danish men's footballers
Esbjerg fB players
Olympic footballers of Denmark
Footballers at the 1952 Summer Olympics